Molchanovsky (masculine), Molchanovskaya (feminine), or Molchanovskoye (neuter) may refer to:
Molchanovsky District, a district of Tomsk Oblast, Russia
Molchanovsky (rural locality), a rural locality (a settlement) in Tambov Oblast, Russia